Swords (a self-contained town outside Historic Dublin County and modern Fingal County) has developed into the largest town in Ireland. The town's population boom began in the 1970s with the construction of the sprawling Rivervalley Estate, Ireland's largest private housing development, ahead of Kilnamanagh Estate in Tallaght North, and continued during the 1990s and 2000s, with many new residents moving to the area due to its proximity to their work at Dublin Airport. Swords is accessed by the R132 and the M1 motorway.

At the 2011 census the total urban population was 42,738, which makes it the largest town in Fingal, although not officially recognised. Unlike most large towns, Swords does not have a town council or any legal boundaries. Towns which do not have legal boundaries are classified as Census Towns for statistical reasons and are given borders by the Central Statistics Office. However, when they gave borders to the Swords census town they excluded the Drynam and Holywell housing estates, and considered them as a separate census town of "Kinsealy-Drinan". The "Swords" census town had a population of 36,924 (the third largest in Ireland), and the "Kinsealy-Drinan" census town had a population of 5,814. This contradicts their own guidelines which say that borders will be extended to include all occupied dwellings within 100 metres of an existing building. According to the CSO's own SAPMAP viewer, there is definitely less than 100 meters between the two census towns, down to only 10 metres at one point. The two census towns are part of the same urban area, and are both within the Swords development boundary, as defined by Fingal County Council. When put together they have a total population of 42,738, well ahead of Irelands official largest town, Drogheda (38,578). The reason that two census towns were identified is probably because of an area of undeveloped land between them at Barryparks. This land has been left undeveloped because Fingal County Council has reserved it for commercial use to allow Swords develop its own city centre. This problem can't be resolved until at least the next census in 2016, although it could also be resolved by applying legal boundaries to Swords, covering the entire developed urban area.

Fingal County Council have referred to Swords as an "Emerging City", and expect that the town's (or city's) population will reach 100,000 by 2035.

The town is close to Dublin Airport, and is separated from the city by a narrow green belt around the airport.

The table below contains the population breakdown by Census Towns and Electoral Divisions (ED's) in Swords, taken from the 2011 census results.

These are the 2011 Ethnic groups for Swords.

70.2% White Irish (30,946 people)

17.0% Other White (7,089 people)

2.7% Asian (1169 people)

2.6% Black (1142 people)

0.4% Irish Traveller (96 people)

7.1% Other/Not Stated (2096 people)

Total (All Ethnic groups): 42,738

Census 2011

Sex, age and marital status

Migration and ethnicity

Irish language

Families

Private Households

Housing 
Swords is a socio-economically mixed area with the local housing stock being made up of private and local authority housing.

In 1999 the Seatown Villas area of Swords celebrated 50 years in existence, making it the oldest local authority housing estate in Dublin outside of the city limits. In 2005, Fingal County Council opened 138 council housing units in the Applewood development in Swords. This is the first such public-private housing development to take place in Fingal where private development is inter-mixed with local authority housing. This successful pilot scheme has been replicated in the south of the town in the Boroimhe Estate and also in the Mulhuddart area.

Communal Establishments

Principal Status

Social Class and Socio-Economic Group

Education

Commuting

Disability, carers and general health

Occupation

Industries

PC and Internet Access

See also
Swords, Dublin

References

Swords, Dublin